Jonathan Mangum (born January 16, 1971) is an American actor and comedian. He was a cast member of the variety show The Wayne Brady Show and is the announcer for the game show Let's Make a Deal.

Early life
Mangum was born in Charleston, South Carolina and grew up in Mobile, Alabama. After high school, he moved to Orlando and graduated from the University of Central Florida with a degree in psychology. While in Orlando, Mangum started his comedy career at the SAK Comedy Lab alongside Wayne Brady, whom he would later collaborate with in Drew Carey's Improv-A-Ganza, The Wayne Brady Show and Let's Make a Deal. He moved to Los Angeles in 1995 to pursue a career in comedy.

Career

Comedy
Mangum guest-starred in several episodes as the owner of a web-based start-up company on The Drew Carey Show. He has toured with Drew Carey's Improv All-Stars, establishing himself as an improv comedian and was also a regular cast member on Drew Carey's Green Screen Show. At the beginning of 2011, he and Brady made guest appearances in the British comedy series Fast and Loose, an improv show similar to Whose Line Is It Anyway?. He was a regular performer in Drew Carey's Improv-a-ganza and performed in improvisational singing games, along with co-stars like Jeff Davis and Chip Esten. He is also one of the rotating guest performers on the revived CW Whose Line is it Anyway? which started in the summer of 2013.

Starting March 27, 2020, Mangum began live-streaming the show Ujokes, a comedy game show that features two professional comedians. Contestants play mini-games and compete for who has the funniest joke, which is decided by the audience. Along with the comedians, the audience can compete with their own jokes, and the winner from the audience is invited to join next week's stream for a segment. The show is live-streamed on Twitch and YouTube every Monday.

Television
Mangum made guest appearances on ER, Reno 911!, and Just Shoot Me!. In addition to his work in television and on stage, Mangum has also appeared in over 100 national American commercials. He has written for the Disney Channel and The N, as well as having twice written for director Ben Rock on the short films The Meeting and Conversations, which stars Curtis Armstrong.

In 2012, Mangum starred in the ABC improv comedy series Trust Us with Your Life.

In addition to his role on Let's Make A Deal, he has appeared on The Price is Right during the show's "Mash-Up Week" episodes which have aired annually since 2016.

Personal life
Mangum is married to Leah Stanko, a casting director; the couple have two sons.

Filmography

Film

Television

References

External links

Official website

1971 births
Male actors from South Carolina
American male comedians
21st-century American comedians
American male television actors
American television personalities
Game show announcers
University of Central Florida alumni
Let's Make a Deal
Living people
Male actors from Charleston, South Carolina